Cornelia Gröschel (born 1 December 1987) is a German actress.

Biography 
Cornelia Gröschel grew up as one of four children in an artistic family in Dresden. Her father is a singer and a voice teacher, her mother is a ballet répétiteur. As a child Cornelia applied for a role in the television series In aller Freundschaft and from 1998 could be seen playing Franzi Moers in episodes 2 to 16. In 2001, she appeared in the title role in Markus Imboden's film adaptation of Heidi. After a ten-month stay in South Africa and graduation from the St. Benno Gymnasium in Dresden-Johannstadt, from 2007 to 2011 she studied acting at the University of Music and Theatre "Felix Mendelssohn Bartholdy" Leipzig. During her study, she had guest appearances at the Neues Theater Halle. In 2010 she played Juliet in Romeo and Juliet in the Hexenkessel Hoftheater in the Monbijoupark, Berlin. Since September 2011 she is part of the troupe of the Badisches Staatstheater Karlsruhe.

Cornelia Gröschel's other starring roles on television include a 2006 episode of the crime series Polizeiruf 110 titled Schneewittchen (Snow White), a title role in the 2012 ZDF fairytale Die Schöne und das Biest, and in 2013 the satirical sitcom Lerchenberg, also on ZDF.

Filmography

References

External links 
 
 
 Cornelia Gröschel's profile at the Badisches Staatstheater Karlsruhe
 Cornelia Gröschel's profile at the Ahoi agency

1987 births
Living people
Actors from Dresden
German child actresses
German film actresses
German television actresses